Amy Reeder (born August 25, 1980), formerly known as Amy Reeder Hadley, is an American comic book artist and writer known for her work on titles such as Fool's Gold, Madame Xanadu, Batwoman, and Moon Girl and Devil Dinosaur.

Early life
Amy Reeder was born August 25, 1980. She is originally from Denver, Colorado and obtained a Bachelor of Science in Social Science Teaching.

Career
Amy Reeder was first discovered through the fourth of Tokyopop's Rising Stars of Manga competitions and later wrote and illustrated the OEL manga Fool's Gold.

Reeder became the lead artist on the Madame Xanadu series from DC Comics' Vertigo imprint, with writer Matt Wagner. In a 2007 interview, she credited editor Brandon Montclare with helping her get her start in the comics industry.  In 2010, DC announced that she would take over alternate art duties for the Batwoman series with J. H. Williams III, in addition to providing variant covers to that title and Supergirl, the latter of which she began with issue 55. She then left the Batwoman book due to "creative differences" in the middle of the next story arc. Reeder moved to Image Comics and created Rocket Girl with writer Brandon Montclare. In 2015, she and Montclare began co-writing Moon Girl and Devil Dinosaur for Marvel Comics.

Technique and materials
In addition to pencils and an electric eraser, Reeder employs, for her hand-colored work, Copic Multiliners and Copic Markers. Reeder is left-handed, and when illustrating a cover, she begins the bottom right of the drawing surface and works her way to the top left, in order to avoid smears. She also employs a drawing tablet for her digital work. Computer programs that she uses include Adobe Photoshop, Corel Painter, and ComicWorks.

Personal life
Reeder enjoys writing music, singing and sewing. She resides in the Greenwich Village neighborhood in Manhattan.

Awards

Nominations
2009 Eisner Award for Best New Series (with Wagner and Friend, for Madame Xanadu)
2009 Eisner Award for Best Penciller/Inker or Penciller/Inker Team (with Friend, for Madame Xanadu)
2009 Eisner Award for Best Cover Artist (for Madame Xanadu)

Bibliography
 Fool's Gold (script and art), Tokyopop, July 2006
 Madame Xanadu #1–10, 16–18, 21–23, 29 (pencils/inks in #1–2, pencils only in others), script by Matt Wagner; inks by Richard Friend, ongoing series, Vertigo, August 2008–January 2011
 "Madame Xanadu in: Captive Audience" (pencils), script by Matt Wagner, in House of Mystery: Halloween Annual 1, Vertigo, December 2009
 Supergirl vol. 5 #55–61, 63, 66, Annual #2 (covers only), ongoing series, DC Comics, October 2010–September 2011
 Batwoman #0, 6–8 (pencils), script by J. H. Williams III and W. Haden Blackman; inks by Rob Hunter and Richard Friend, ongoing series, DC Comics, January 2011, April–June 2012
 Halloween Eve #1 (pencils and inks), script by Brandon Montclare, one-shot, Image Comics, October 2012
 Ghosts vol. 2 #1 (pencils and inks), script by Cecil Castellucci, one-shot, DC Comics, December 2012
 Rocket Girl #1–10 (pencils and inks), script by Brandon Montclare, limited series, Image Comics, October 2013–May 2014
 Moon Girl and Devil Dinosaur #1–19 script by Reeder and Brandon Montclare, art by Natacha Bustos, ongoing series, Marvel Comics, January 2016–July 2017
Amethyst (2020) #1-6, script by Reeder, limited series, DC Comics, April 2020-February 2021

References

External links

 Official Tumblr blog
 Amy Reeder at Twitter
 
 Amy Reeder Hadley at DeviantArt
 Amy Reeder at Mike's Amazing World of Comics
 

1980 births
21st-century American artists
American female comics artists
American comics writers
Artists from Denver
Artists from New York City
DC Comics people
Female comics writers
Living people
Marvel Comics people
Marvel Comics writers